Bongouanou is the town in east-central Ivory Coast. It is a sub-prefecture of and the seat of Bongouanou Department. It is also the seat of Moronou Region in Lacs District and a commune.

In 2021, the population of the sub-prefecture of Bongouanou was 74,281.

Villages
The 13 villages of the sub-prefecture of Bongouanou and their population in 2014 are:

References

Sub-prefectures of Moronou Region
Communes of Moronou Region
Regional capitals of Ivory Coast